Novy is a rural locality (a settlement) in Dvinitskoye Rural Settlement, Sokolsky District, Vologda Oblast, Russia. The population was 60 as of 2002.

Geography 
The distance to Sokol is 40.5 km, to Chekshino is 2.5 km. Shadrino is the nearest rural locality.

References 

Rural localities in Sokolsky District, Vologda Oblast